Glen Fernaigh River, a perennial river of the Clarence River catchment, is located in the Northern Rivers region of New South Wales, Australia.

Course and features
Glen Fernaigh River rises on the Dorrigo Plateau within the Great Dividing Range near Hernani, west of Dorrigo, and flows generally northeast then east before reaching its confluence with the Nymboida River near Tyringham, northwest of Dorrigo.

See also

 Rivers of New South Wales
 List of rivers of New South Wales (A–K)
 List of rivers of Australia

References

 

Rivers of New South Wales
Northern Rivers